The 2013–14 Prima Divisione season is the thirty-sixth and final football league season of Italian Prima Divisione since its establishment in 1978, and the fifth since the renaming from Serie C to Lega Pro.

It is divided into two phases: the regular season, and the playoff phase. The league is composed of 33 teams divided into two divisions of 16 (Lega Pro Prima Divisione A) and 17 teams (Lega Pro Prima Divisione B).

Teams finishing first in the regular season, plus one team winning the playoff round from each division will be promoted to Serie B. No team will be relegated, as all non-promoted league participants will take part in the first season of the unified Lega Pro league in 2014–15.

There was only one repechage from Seconda Divisione by Carrarese to fill the vacant spot created after the failure of Tritium.

Girone A

Teams
Teams from  Emilia-Romagna, Liguria, Lombardy, Piedmont, San Marino, Trentino-Alto Adige/Südtirol, Tuscany & Veneto  

1 Venezia played roughly the first half of the season in Stadio Piergiovanni Mecchia in Portogruaro.

League table

Play-off

Girone B

Teams
Teams from Abruzzo, Apulia, Calabria, Campania, Lazio, Marche, Tuscany & Umbria

League table

Play-off

References

Lega Pro Prima Divisione seasons
3
Italy